Kenza is a 1999 studio album by Algerian singer-songwriter Khaled.

The album was named after Khaled's second daughter Kenza. Kenza is Arabic for treasure.

Kenza has attained gold certification by Syndicat National de l'Edition Phonographique.

The album was re-released by Ark 21 and Wrasse Records. It is featured in Robert Dimery's 1001 Albums You Must Hear Before You Die.

Track listing

European edition

Label: Barclay (Universal)
"Aâlach Tloumouni" – 5:02
"El Harba Wine" (featuring Amar) – 4:33
"C'est la nuit" – 5:04
"Imagine" (featuring Noa) – 4:07
"Trigue Lycee" – 4:43
"E'dir E'sseba" – 5:50
"Ya Aâchkou" – 3:57
"Melha" – 6:07
"Raba-Raba" – 5:37
"El Bab" – 5:28
"El Aâdyene" – 5:37
"Gouloulha-Dji" – 5:37
"Mele H'bibti" – 6:29
"Derwiche Tourneur" – 6:00
"Leïli" ("C'est la nuit" Arab version) – 4:08
The Barclay edition, 543 397 2, contains full sung texts in French or Arabic romanization.

U.S. edition
Label: Ark 21 USA
"Aâlach Tloumouni" – 5:02
"El Harba Wine" (featuring Amar) – 4:33
"Leïli" ("C'est la nuit" Arab version) – 4:08
"Trigue Lycee" – 4:43
"E'dir E'sseba" – 5:50
"Ya Aâchkou" – 3:57
"Melha" – 6:07
"Raba-Raba" – 5:37
"El Bab" – 5:28
"El Aâdyene" – 5:37
"Gouloulha-Dji" – 5:37
"Mele H'bibti" – 6:29
"Derwiche Tourneur" – 6:00
"Chebba (Man City Remix)" – 5:19

References 

Khaled (musician) albums
1999 albums
Albums produced by Steve Hillage